Roman Vladimirovich Yampolskiy (born 13 August 1979) is a Russian computer scientist at the University of Louisville, known for his work on behavioral biometrics, security of cyberworlds, and artificial intelligence safety. He holds a PhD from the University at Buffalo (2008). He is currently the director of Cyber Security Laboratory in the department of Computer Engineering and Computer Science at the Speed School of Engineering.

Yampolskiy is an author of some 100 publications, including numerous books.

AI safety
Yampolskiy has warned of the possibility of existential risk from advanced artificial intelligence, and has advocated research into "boxing" artificial intelligence. More broadly, Yampolskiy and his collaborator, Michaël Trazzi, have proposed introducing "achilles heels" into potentially dangerous AI, for example by barring an AI from accessing and modifying its own source code. Another proposal is to apply a "security mindset" to AI safety, itemizing potential outcomes in order to better evaluate proposed safety mechanisms.

Intellectology
In 2015, Yampolskiy launched intellectology, a new field of study founded to analyze the forms and limits of intelligence.  Yampolskiy considers AI to be a sub-field of this. An example of Yampolskiy's intellectology work is an attempt to determine the relation between various types of minds and the accessible fun space, i.e. the space of non-boring activities.

Books
 Artificial Superintelligence: a Futuristic Approach. Chapman and Hall/CRC Press (Taylor & Francis Group), 2015, .
 Game Strategy: a Novel Behavioral Biometric. Independent University Press, 2009, 
 Computer Security: from Passwords to Behavioral Biometrics. New Academic Publishing, 2008, 
 Feature Extraction Approaches for Optical Character Recognition. Briviba Scientific Press, 2007,

See also
AI box
AI-complete
Machine Intelligence Research Institute
Singularity University

References

External links
 Roman Yampolskiy’s Homepage.
 Cyber Security Lab at UofL.
 Interview of Dr. Yampolskiy on EEweb.
 Rise of the Machines (talk on superintelligence)

1979 births
Living people
Latvian scientists
Latvian computer scientists
Computer scientists
University at Buffalo alumni